Rodine may refer to:

Places 
Rodine, Črnomelj, a settlement in the Municipality of Črnomelj, Slovenia
Rodine pri Trebnjem, a settlement in the Municipality of Trebnje, Slovenia
Rodine, Žirovnica, a settlement in the Municipality of Žirovnica, Slovenia

Other
 Rodine, a former brand of acid corrosion inhibitor manufactured by Henkel KGaA and currently rebranded to "Bonderite"
 Rodine, a brand of rodenticide containing yellow phosphorus, manufactured by Rentokil Initial

See also
 Roedean, East Sussex
 Roedean School